RAF North Luffenham was a Royal Air Force station in Rutland, England, 1940 - 1998.  It is near to the villages of Edith Weston and North Luffenham.

History

Second World War

The station was built as a training airfield, opening in 1940.  It was later taken over by 5 Group of RAF Bomber Command as a heavy bomber base, and was expanded by the building of concrete runways later in the war.

Post war
In 1951, the station was transferred to the Royal Canadian Air Force to become the temporary home of 1 Fighter Wing, the first Canadian NATO base in Europe. 1 Wing moved to Marville, France in 1955.

In late 1955, No. 228 Operational Conversion Unit, temporarily renamed No. 238 OCU, was detached to North Luffenham from RAF Leeming which was having its runways extended to 7000 ft to accommodate Gloster Javelins. The OCU remained for over a year before returning to Leeming.

From 1959 to 1963, North Luffenham was the base for PGM-17 Thor intermediate range ballistic missiles, operated by No. 144 Squadron RAF. The Thor missile site was listed as a Grade II* building in 2011.

In mid-1964 No. 3 Ground Radio Servicing Squadron was transferred from RAF Norton, Sheffield, Yorkshire. No. 3GRSS was responsible for the third-line maintenance repair of all ground radar and radio communication/navigational and landing aids located at airfields throughout Great Britain and Northern Ireland.

In 1963 the RAF Aviation Medical Training Centre (AMTC) moved from its original location at RAF Upwood to RAF North Luffenham. The Centre was commanded by a senior RAF Medical Officer who with his medical and technical team were responsible for fitting and instructing aircrew in the use of flying protective clothing and equipment, including partial pressure suits, which kept the pilot conscious in the event of loss of cabin pressure at high altitude. Instruction in medical aspects of high performance aviation included experience of hypoxia and exposure to sudden explosive decompression of an aircraft cabin. This was carried out in a complex of RAF Mark V decompression chambers installed on the site for aircrew training and research purposes. Many of the aircrew medical monitoring techniques, oxygen systems and items of aircrew protective flying clothing developed at the RAF Institute of Aviation Medicine, Farnborough, were assessed by staff of AMTC.From 1965 to 1997 part of the Joint Services Language School was based here. Primary languages taught included Russian and Mandarin. Russian-language graduates of the school were employed at radio monitoring stations located close to the USSR border mostly in Gatow, Berlin, in order to monitor Russian air-to-ground radio voice traffic during airborne interception/ border incursion etc. Some also were stationed at Digby, and some were sent on airborne duties, variously stationed including Wyton, Cyprus etc. Most of the Chinese graduates were officers and stationed in Hong-Kong. Most of the teachers were emigres or ex-Russian military. A plaque to commemorate the Language School was unveiled in 2005 by Air Commodore Bruce Benstead, the last Station Commander at RAF North Luffenham. Recruits from RAF Swinderby completed their fieldcraft training at this base in the 80s and early 90s.

Notable former rugby players from RAF North Luffenham include Sir Augustus Walker (RAF & England), Peter Larter (Northampton & England) and Martin Whitcombe (Leicester Tigers & England 'B' international).

When the RAF vacated the base, the gates from the main entrance were donated to the village of North Luffenham. The gates which bear the station badge were later erected at the entrance to the village's recreation ground.

The station was taken over by the British Army and renamed St George's Barracks in 1998.

Units

The following units were here at some point:

Units

See also
 List of former Royal Air Force stations

References

Citations

Bibliography

External links 
Official RAF WW2 History

North Luffenham
North Luffenham
Grade II* listed buildings in Rutland
North Luff
Military installations closed in 1998